Loch Ettrick is a body of water near Thornhill and Ae, Dumfries and Galloway, in the Southern Uplands of Scotland.

Ettrick